Ghuskar is a village in Gosainganj block of Lucknow district, Uttar Pradesh, India. As of 2011, its population is 3,482, in 605 households. It is the seat of a gram panchayat.

References 

Villages in Lucknow district